Yearngill is a hamlet in the English county of Cumbria.

Yearngill is located less than a mile southeast of the village of Westnewton.
It is also located near the Civil Parish of Aspatria

External links 

Hamlets in Cumbria
Allerdale